Domoina Soavina Atsimondrano Antananarivo, usually referred simply as DSA, is a Malagasy football club based in Antananarivo, Madagascar. The team has won the THB Champions League in 1998, qualifying them for the 1999 CAF Champions League.

The team currently plays in the Malagasy Second Division.  C.A DIGNE

Achievements
THB Champions League: 2
1997, 1998

Performance in CAF competitions
CAF Champions League: 1 appearance
1999 CAF Champions League - first round

2000 CAF Cup

References

External links

Football clubs in Madagascar
Antananarivo